The 550s decade ran from January 1, 550, to December 31, 559.

Significant people

References

Bibliography